Pi Delta Nu was a small national professional fraternity for women in chemistry. It was founded in 1921 at the University of Missouri. Eventually chartering at least five chapters, it survived into the 1950s.

History and Mission
Pi Delta Nu was originally created as the Women's Chemistry Club, established at the University of Missouri in 1919. In 1920 the name of the group was changed to The Retort, and on April 12, 1921 the club was reorganized as Pi Delta Nu, a professional fraternity for women in chemistry.

Charter members were Margaret Baxter, Majory Austry, Ada Brainard, Mary V. Dover, Eastern M. Griffith, Agnes Hays, Dorothy V. Nightingale, Grave Petty, Ruth Rusk, Esther W. Stearn, Helen Wamsley, Mollie G. White, Ruth Woodworth, and Kathryn Wyant.

Annual editions of the Missouri Savitar yearbook show it continuing until at least 1956 at the school. Beta chapter at the University of Minnesota was formed, likewise remaining active until at least 1956. A third unit was established at Syracuse University with active members at least until 1940. There were at least two other chapters.

The society was originally organized for women in chemistry, but later widened its scope to include girls interested in the fields of bacteriology, zoology, pre-medicine, and physical therapy.  The first two editions of the Missouri Savitar yearbook showing the group actually list the society as "Pi Delta Nu and The Retort," indicating it may have evolved from a publication committee.

Organization
The government is by a grand council composed of the national officers and the last grand president. As of 1935, Biennial conventions were held.

Characteristics
Both undergraduate and graduate women taking Chemistry either as principal or secondary subject of specialization are eligible for membership.

Its motto, as cited soon after WWII, was: "Victory Through Foresight."

The sorority had three purposes: "To bring together women interested in science, to help fit women for scientific careers, and to inculcate scholarly ideals in its members."

Chapters
Chapters as of 1935:

1921 Alpha chapter - University of Missouri
1925 Beta chapter - University of Minnesota
1927 Gamma chapter - Syracuse University
1929 Delta chapter - University of Buffalo
1930 Epsilon chapter - Montana State College

Insignia and Traditions
Pi Delta Nu's badge had originally been an oblong square in gold, with a band in the center supporting its letters. This was soon replaced, by 1935 at least, by a stylized pin in gold, consisting of two equilateral triangles pointing up and down and overlapping, with the raised Greek letters  on a center band. Above the letters was a retort and below an emerald.  The pin was surrounded by 22 pearls, eleven above and eleven below.

The pledge pin is a small silver retort with the letters  on the bowl.

The crest consists of a knight bearing upon his shoulder the balanced scale of justice and on his arm a shield upon which is a retort, a helix, a crucible, a scalpel and an open book. Underneath is a scroll bearing the words Pi Delta Nu in Greek script.

Its colors are "gentian violet" and gold. ("Gentian violet" was noteworthy as the name of a dye that was once used in certain antibacterial and classification procedures.)

The sorority's flower was the violet.

The Fraternity's magazine was The Retort.

See also 

 Professional fraternities and sororities

References 

Defunct fraternities and sororities
Student organizations established in 1921
1921 establishments in Missouri